Ole Christopher Lee (September 27, 1847 – February 11, 1919) was a member of the Wisconsin State Assembly.

Biography
Ole Christopher Lee was born in Norway. As a child, he moved to the United States, arriving with his family in 1850. He settled in Stoughton, Wisconsin in 1879. He married Amelia Anderson in 1885. Lee died in Stoughton on February 11, 1919.

Political career
After working as a county schoolteacher, Lee was clerk of Stoughton from 1882 to 1887 and mayor in 1888. After serving as a member of the Dane County, Wisconsin Board of Supervisors from 1889 to 1893, he was elected to the Wisconsin State Assembly in 1894 and served until 1895.

References

Norwegian emigrants to the United States
People from Stoughton, Wisconsin
Members of the Wisconsin State Assembly
Mayors of places in Wisconsin
County supervisors in Wisconsin
City and town clerks
1847 births
1919 deaths
19th-century American politicians